Duncan Toombs is an Australian singer-songwriter, musician and video director. He has won seven Golden Guitar Awards for Music Video of the Year. Toombs released his debut studio album, Steel on Steel in January 2023.

Career
In June 2022, Toombs released his debut single "Run"; recorded during a two-day stay at Rod McCormack's, The Music Cellar on the NSW Central Coast. Steel on Steel was released on 13 January 2023.

Discography

Studio albums

Awards and nominations

ARIA Music Awards 
The ARIA Music Awards is an annual awards ceremony that recognises excellence, innovation, and achievement across all genres of Australian music.

! 
|-
| 2015
| "Spirit of the Anzacs" by Lee Kernaghan (directed by Duncan Toombs)
| ARIA Award for Best Video
| 
| 
|}

Country Music Awards of Australia
The Country Music Awards of Australia is an annual awards night held in January during the Tamworth Country Music Festival. Celebrating recording excellence in the Australian country music industry. They commenced in 1973.
 
 (wins only)
! 
|-
| 2010
| "When I Was a Boy" by Greg Storer & Sara Storer (directed by Duncan Toombs)
| rowspan="7"| Video Clip of the Year
| 
| rowspan="7"| 
|-
| 2011
| "Calling Me Home" by Sara Storer (directed by Duncan Toombs)
| 
|-
| 2012
| "Children of the Gurindji" by Sara Storer & Kev Carmody (directed by Duncan Toombs)
| 
|-
| 2013
| "Piece of Me" by The McClymonts (directed by Duncan Toombs)
| 
|-
| 2014
| "Flying with the King" by Lee Kernaghan (directed by Duncan Toombs)
| 
|-
| 2015
| "Canoe" by Sara Storer (directed by Duncan Toombs)
| 
|-
| 2016
| "Spirit of the Anzacs" by Lee Kernaghan & Special Guests (directed by Duncan Toombs)
| 
|-

References

Living people
Australian country singers
Australian male singers
1977 births